Ottayadipathakal is a 1993 Indian Malayalam-language film, directed by C. Radhakrishnan and produced by Vincent Chittilappally. The film stars Madhu, Revathy, Sreenath and Kaviyoor Ponnamma. The film has musical score by Mohan Sithara.

Cast
 
Madhu 
Revathy as Sathi
Sreenath as Anoop
Kaviyoor Ponnamma 
M. Chandran Nair 
Isaac Thomas 
Nimisha Suresh 
K. M. A. Raheem

Soundtrack
The music was composed by Mohan Sithara.

References

External links
  
 

1993 films
1990s Malayalam-language films